Deh-e Mir (also Romanized as Deh-e Mīr, Deh-i-Mīr, and Deh Mīr; also known as Deh-e Mīz) is a village in Kuhestan Rural District, Jazmurian District, Rudbar-e Jonubi County, Kerman Province, Iran. At the 2006 census, its population was 89, in 30 families.

References 

Populated places in Rudbar-e Jonubi County